Charleville ( or An Ráth) is a town in north County Cork, Ireland. It lies in the Golden Vale, on a tributary of the River Maigue, near the border with County Limerick. Charleville is on the N20 road and is the second-largest town between Limerick and Cork, the largest being Mallow. The Roman Catholic parish of Charleville is within the Diocese of Cloyne. Significant industries in the town include Kerry Co-Op and the construction and services sectors.

Names
The old name for the place was Rathcogan, later Rathgogan or Rathgoggan, the last still the name of the civil parish around the town. The name means Cogan's rath (ringfort), after the family of Miles de Cogan, granted lands there after the 12th-century Norman invasion. The new town begun by Roger Boyle, 1st Earl of Orrery in 1661 was named Charleville after Charles II, who had been restored to the throne the previous year.

Later Irish speakers referred to the town as An Ráth "the rath", a short form of the older Irish name. The name  ["Lorc's rath"] was first attached to Charleville in an 1849 collection of 18th-century Irish-language poems with English translations. The translation of an aisling by Conchúbhar Máistir Ó Ríordáin interpreted  as denoting the town of Charleville. T. F. O'Rahilly felt that , like the more common , was a poetic name for Ireland. D. A. Binchy felt the term, also used by Aogán Ó Rathaille, did refer to a specific place, but likely somewhere in Muskerry, not Charleville. After the 1920 local elections, Sinn Féin-dominated councils loyal to the self-proclaimed Irish Republic often sought to replace placenames having British monarchic allusions with older Gaelic names. Although Rathgoggan was mooted by Charleville Rural District Council, Risteárd Ó Foghladha ["Fiachra Eilgeach"] advised that Ráth Luirc was the old name, and it was changed to Rathluirc in 1920. Ó Foghladh claimed Lorc was an ancient king of Munster; in fact Lóegaire Lorc was a mythical High King of Ireland.

The Placenames Commission was established in the 1940s to systematically determine the authentic Irish names of places, and based on its advice that An Ráth was the commonly used name among the last generations of local Irish speakers, this was legally made the Irish name in 1975. Thus the town had the anomalous position that its English-language legal name was an Irish name different from its Irish-language legal name. The name "Charleville" remained in common use. In December 1989, a plebiscite of residents under the Local Government Act 1946 voted on four names: of 2200 electors, 1500 voted (over 90%) for Charleville. Official documents before and after 1989 have often used "Rathluirc (Charleville)" or similar formulations. Local sports teams have a rath or fort in their crest, reflecting the Irish name.

History
Charleville was founded in 1661 by Roger Boyle, 1st Earl of Orrery. Roger Boyle had been a supporter of Oliver Cromwell in the English Civil War. When King Charles II was restored in 1660, he had to prove his loyalty to the crown. He did this by naming Charleville after the English king.  The villages of Brohill and Rathgoggin, who in their former guise preceded the formation of the town of Charleville in the area, fell under the rule of the following political entities: the Eoghanachta of southern Munster, at some point by the Hiberno-Norman Lordships of Ireland 1169–1541 although this rule was nominal rather than actual and subsequently by the Kingdom of Desmond 1118 – 1596. The lands of Broghill and Rathgogan were purchased by 
Roger's father Richard Boyle as a part of the Plantation of Munster and Roger subsequently established his residency there after the founding of Charleville. 

During the time of the Penal Laws, practising the Catholic faith was illegal. As a result, the parish of Charleville was amalgamated with the parishes Bruree and Colmanswell, both in the Diocese of Limerick. In 1704, Fr. Daniel Mac Namara of Bruree was registered as the Catholic priest for this very large pastoral area. The fact that Catholics had to attend Mass secretly meant that the old chapel in Holy Cross cemetery was abandoned. The remains of this church – now overgrown with ivy – are still to be seen in the centre of the graveyard. Indeed, like so many other pre-1700 churches, the old church of Holy Cross literally became part of the surrounding graveyard, in that several gravestones, both marked and unmarked, are to be found within the building itself. Upon one such gravestone is a Latin epitaph to none other than Seán Clárach Mac Domhnaill (1691–1754), who was, in his time, the Chief Poet of Munster, as well as a native of Charleville.

Geography
Charleville is geographically located at 'the heart of Munster', within the Golden Vale region. It is 60 km from Cork city to the south and 40 km from Limerick city to the north.

Charleville lies within the Cork North-West Dáil constituency.

Economy
Charleville is a centre for the food processing industry, with brands such as Charleville Cheese and Golden Vale produced by Kerry Co-Op.

Retail
Charleville has a strong retail sector, It is home to retailers such as Eurogiant, Murrays, Morans, Bridgets, charisma fashions and Noonans Sports. Dunnes Stores recently opened a store in the town center. Charleville is also home to stores and restaurants such as Lidl, Supervalu, Centra, Supermacs, Elverys Sports, Aldi and Amber.

Engineering
Numerous spin-offs both in the town of Charleville and the surrounding area were created when Golden Vale Engineering closed its doors in 1983.  The largest amongst these were BCD Engineering, Diamond Engineering and Sapphire Engineering. BCD is the second largest employer in Charleville.

Cheese
Golden Vale (part of the Kerry Group) continue to make cheese products in the town. Golden Vale is the largest employer in Charleville.

Social
Charleville has numerous pubs as well as two theatre facilities and is home to the North Cork Drama Festival which is held in the Parochial Hall. The second facility is the Schoolyard Theatre which is home to the Shoestring Theatre group.

Transport
Charleville is at the junction of the N20 national road and the R515 regional road. The N20 runs north–south from Limerick to Cork cities, the R515 east–west from Tipperary town to near Abbeyfeale. The R578 runs from Charleville to Ballydesmond. Charleville is on Bus Éireann routes 51 (Cork – Limerick – Shannon Airport – Galway) and 320 (Limerick – Charleville). It is 65 km from both Cork Airport and Shannon Airport. It is approximately 550km from High Halstow.

Charleville railway station is on the Dublin–Cork railway line. It opened in 1849 on the Great Southern and Western Railway. The former Cork–Limerick line branched off the Cork–Dublin line at Charleville, continuing via Croom; the final goods train ran in 1976, since when Limerick Junction, already the junction for Dublin–Limerick, has also been the junction for Cork–Limerick.

Education
Secondary schools in the area include CBS Charleville, St. Mary's Secondary School (Charleville), and Mannix College (which is no longer a secondary School).
Other schools include Charleville CBS Primary, St. Anne's, St. Joseph's and the Holy Family School.

Charleville's library is located in the former Church of Ireland church of the parish (which went into disrepair in the 1950/1960s when the Protestant population of the area declined).

Sport
Sporting clubs in the area include Charleville GAA club and Charleville Camogie Club. The Ráth Luirc GAA Sports Centre has squash, badminton and tennis facilities. There is also a handball court in the area.

The local rugby club is Charleville RFC, and soccer club is Charleville AFC.

Charleville Golf Club and Charleville Pitch and Putt Club are also based locally.

People
 Éamon de Valera (1882-1975), former Taoiseach and President, was educated at C.B.S Charleville.
 Aaron Doran (b.1991), Irish association footballer and 2015 Scottish Cup winner with Inverness Caledonian Thistle.
 Keith Hanley (b.1993), winner of The Voice of Ireland series 2.
 Con Leahy (1876–1921), an Irish athlete who won Olympic medals at the 1906 and 1908 Games, was born here
 Eliza Lynch (1833–1886), former first lady of Paraguay, was born locally.
 Seán Clárach Mac Domhnaill (1691–1754), Chief Poet of Munster who was born in nearby Churchtown, lived in the area
 Daniel Mannix (1864–1963), Archbishop of Melbourne for 46 years, and one of the most influential public figures in 20th-century Australia, was born near Charleville.
 William Reeves (1815–1892), antiquarian, bishop, and President of the Royal Irish Academy, was born in Charleville

Town twinning

Charleville is twinned with Plouaret - Le Vieux-Marché, Brittany, in France.

See also
 List of towns and villages in Ireland
 Market Houses in Ireland
 Charleville (Parliament of Ireland constituency)

Footnotes

References

External links

 Charleville Chamber

Towns and villages in County Cork
Articles on towns and villages in Ireland possibly missing Irish place names